The F800S was a sport bike made by BMW Motorrad from 2006 to 2010.  Along with the closely related sport touring F800ST, other bikes in the F-bike range are the dual-sport F800GS, and the naked F800R.   

BMW developed with Rotax a  parallel-twin engine with a 360 degree firing order. This produced an exhaust note reminiscent of BMW's signature air-cooled boxer twins. However, this firing order required both pistons to move up and down at the same time. To counter the significant inertia produced by the pistons reciprocating, BMW devised a third vestigial connecting rod to a balance weight. The result was a parallel twin with significantly reduced vibration compared with other parallel twin engine designs. The engine was oiled by a dry sump system, and a soft ignition-cut rev limiter engaged at 9,000 rpm. 

The engine was notable for early and powerful onset of torque. Chris Pfeiffer used a modified F800S before moving to his signature F800R, using the low-end power of the engine for stunting. BMW tuned the F800 series engine to run lean, typically with air-fuel ratios in the range of 15:1 to 16:1.

The F800S and ST both used low-maintenance belt drives and single sided swingarms. Bikes equipped with ABS also included a rear-wheel lift detection system.

In some markets, including the United States, the F800S was discontinued after the 2007 model year. The F800S was discontinued across most of the world after the summer of 2010 with only a few Central American and Eastern European countries still stocking the last supplies of the model.

References

External links
 Official Website for 2009 Model

F800S
Belt drive motorcycles
Motorcycles introduced in 2006
Sport bikes
Motorcycles powered by straight-twin engines